The Las Vegas Tribe of Paiute Indians of the Las Vegas Indian Colony (Southern Paiute language: Nuvagantucimi, "people of "where snow sits" (i.e. Charleston Peak)) is a federally recognized tribe of Southern Paiute Indians in Southern Nevada.

Reservation

The reservation was first established in 1911 and today is  large. In 1992, 52 tribal members lived on the reservation and 71 people were enrolled in the tribe.

History
The tribe is descended from the Tudinu or "Desert People", ancestors of most of the tribes of Southern Paiutes whose traditional territory is the lower Colorado River valley as well as the mountains and arroyos of the Mojave Desert in Nevada, California and Utah. Beginning in the early 19th century non-native settlers moved into the area, resulting in the displacement of the local tribe from both its water-rich lowland winter and tree-rich mountainous summer campgrounds.
 
Significant permanent settlement began after 1855 when the area was annexed to the United States. That same year a mission of the Church of Jesus Christ of Latter-day Saints (LDS Church) built a fort at the Las Vegas Springs with the dual purpose of converting the Paiutes and acting as a node on a Salt Lake-to-the-sea shipping route. Although the mission was short-lived, it marked the beginning of permanent American settlement at the site when, ten years later, the fort was rebuilt, reinhabited and re-christened the Las Vegas Rancho.

Settlement increased after William A. Clark took ownership of much of the tribe's land, built the San Pedro, Los Angeles and Salt Lake Railroad through it and established the town of Las Vegas adjacent to the region's most significant water source. Seeing the tribe's dispossession, on December 30, 1911 Helen J. Stewart, owner of the pre-railroad Las Vegas Rancho, deeded  of spring-fed downtown Las Vegas land to the Paiutes, creating the Las Vegas Indian Colony. Until 1983 this was the tribe's only communal land, forming a small "town within a town" in downtown Las Vegas.

The tribe ratified their constitution and bylaws on July 22, 1970. They were federally recognized, under the Indian Reorganization Act. In 1983, Congress returned to the tribe  of land between the eastern slopes of Mount Charleston in the Spring Mountains and the western flanks of the Sheep Range. This land now known as the Snow Mountain Reservation of the Las Vegas Tribe of Paiute Indians.

Today
The Las Vegas Tribe of Paiute Indians currently operates a minimart, a cannabis dispensary, two smoke shops; a health and human services program; the Las Vegas Paiute Police Department, with 10 law enforcement officers, and the Las Vegas Paiute Golf Resort, located northwest of Las Vegas. The tribes hosts the Annual Snow Mountain Pow Wow every Memorial Day weekend.

The tribal headquarters is located in Las Vegas. The tribe is governed by a seven-person tribal council.

Notes

References
 Pritzker, Barry M. A Native American Encyclopedia: History, Culture, and Peoples. Oxford: Oxford University Press, 2000. .

External links
 Las Vegas Paiute Tribe, official website

1911 establishments in Nevada
American Indian reservations in Nevada
Federally recognized tribes in the United States
Southern Paiute
Populated places established in 1911
Populated places in Clark County, Nevada
Native American tribes in Nevada